"From Toni with Love... The Video Collection is a greatest videos VHS/DVD compilation by American recording artist Toni Braxton, released by La Face Records on November 20, 2001. The collection contained all of Braxton's music videos from 1992 to 2001, including 2 alternate version videos, 4 remixes, and 2 Spanish videos. It also includes behind-the-scenes clips and two different video biographies of the singer.

Background and content
"From Toni with Love... The Video Collection" is the second greatest videos VHS/DVD compilation released by Toni Braxton, following her 1994 compilation, "The Hit Video Collection". The compilation contains Braxton's videos since her beginning in 1992, until the videos from "The Heat", in 2000. In addition to her 14 official videos, which also includes commentary from Braxton for each of the videos, the collection features 2 alternate version videos (the "unreleased" black and white version of "Another Sad Love Song" and the "European version of "Breathe Again"), 4 remixes ("How Many Ways", "You're Makin' Me High", "Un-Break My Heart" and "Spanish Guitar", 2 Spanish videos ("Breathe Again" and "Un-Break My Heart") and also the unreleased video of "Maybe". It also includes behind-the-scenes clips, live performances and two different video biographies of the singer.

Reception 
Rotten Tomatoes wrote that "'From Toni with Love' is so chock full of music videos, rare interviews, and previously unreleased remixes that it does seem like the singer is sending a love letter to her fans."

Chart performance 
"From Toni With Love... The Video Collection" was certified gold in Brazil, in 2009, for selling over 15,000 copies.

Track listing

References

External links
 
 

2001 video albums
Music video compilation albums
Toni Braxton video albums